Treubiaceae is a family of liverworts in the order Treubiales.  Species are large and leafy, and were previously classified among the Metzgeriales.

References 

Liverwort families
Treubiales